Ivrea Castle ( is a castle located at Piazza Castello in Ivrea, Italy.

History 
It was built in 1358 on behalf of Amadeus VI, Count of Savoy to signify the dominance of the House of Savoy over the region.

In 1676, the northwestern tower, which served as powder magazine, was struck by a lightning. The resulting explosion caused 51 deads, 187 damaged houses and the collapse of the tower itself. The tower has never been rebuilt to its full height.

In the 18th century, the castle was converted into a prison, at the beginning destined to State prisoners only, and later also to common prisoners. It retained this function until 1970.

Description 
The castle has four towers erected on a plan flank. It is located next to a cathedral and a bishop's palace. The castle is mentioned in the work of Giosuè Carducci.

Gallery

References

External links 

Archeocarta File on the Castle—

Castles in Piedmont
Buildings and structures in Ivrea